The 1974 North Indian Ocean cyclone season was part of the annual cycle of tropical cyclone formation. The season has no official bounds but cyclones tend to form between April and December. These dates conventionally delimit the period of each year when most tropical cyclones form in the northern Indian Ocean. There are two main seas in the North Indian Ocean—the Bay of Bengal to the east of the Indian subcontinent and the Arabian Sea to the west of India. The official Regional Specialized Meteorological Centre in this basin is the India Meteorological Department (IMD), while the Joint Typhoon Warning Center (JTWC) releases unofficial advisories. An average of five tropical cyclones form in the North Indian Ocean every season with peaks in May and November. Cyclones occurring between the meridians 45°E and 100°E are included in the season by the IMD.

Systems

Tropical Storm One (01A)
This cyclone was one of the three rare April cyclone which was formed during first fifteen days of the month during the satellite era. The other cyclones were Cyclone Bijli in 2009 and Cyclone Maarutha in 2017.

Tropical Storm Two (02A)
 A system developed in the Arabian Sea in mid-may and a few days later in turned into a  cyclonic storm. As it went in a western direction it strengthened and had a max wind blows of 45 mph and it stayed around the far 1 more day before weakening. Later on May 22 it officially got confirmed as gone. Its other statistics are relatively unknown.

Tropical Storm Three (03B)

Cyclone Six (06B)

Tropical Storm Seven (07A)

Tropical Storm Eight (08B)
The system developed in Bay of Bengal and lasted from September 26 until September 30.

Cyclone Twelve (12B) 
This system developed off the eastern coast of southern India on November 23 and strengthened as it moved to the northeast.  The system nearly reached hurricane strength as it made landfall near Chittagong late on November 28.  A  storm surge accompanied the system's approach to Bangladesh, which inundated several islands offshore.  Less than 100 people perished while thousands were left homeless.

See also

North Indian Ocean tropical cyclone
1974 Atlantic hurricane season
1974 Pacific hurricane season
1974 Pacific typhoon season
Australian cyclone seasons: 1973–74, 1974–75
South Pacific cyclone seasons: 1973–74, 1974–75
South-West Indian Ocean cyclone seasons: 1973–74, 1974–75

References

External links
India Meteorological Department
Joint Typhoon Warning Center 

1974 North Indian Ocean cyclone season